Integrator complex subunit 9 is a protein that in Humans is encoded by the INTS9 gene.

References

Further reading